DL E&C Co., Ltd., formerly the construction division of Daelim Industrial, is a construction company headquartered in Seoul, South Korea.

The fields covered by DL E&C as one of the top EPC companies in Asia to the Middle East include gas, petroleum refining, chemical and petrochemical, power and energy plants, building and housing, civil works, and industrial facilities.

History
The Daelim Group of Industries started out this venture in 1962 from Gyeongsangam-do.

Notable projects
D&L E&C's notable construction projects include Sepung bridge, Geobukseon bridge, Cheong poong bridge and Brunei's Temburong Bridge. In 2013, Daelim was awarded with Malaysia's 3A 1200MW power plant project (US$1.2 billion) and Omani's Sohar Refinery Expansion Project (US$1 billion).

See also
Chaebol

References

External links
 

Conglomerate companies established in 1939
Companies listed on the Korea Exchange
South Korean brands
Companies based in Seoul
DL Group
1939 establishments in Korea